is a musician and filmmaker from Kameoka, Kyoto, Japan. He attended Kyoto University of Foreign Studies, graduating with English.

His work has been noticed by Apple Inc., and a 3-minute promotional video for the company was made about how Takagi creates his videos on a Macintosh system, and Apple Pro software, including Final Cut Pro and Logic Pro. He also uses Adobe After Effects and Adobe Photoshop in his videos. He collaborated with David Sylvian on the track "Exit / Delete" from Coieda (2004).

He wrote the score for Mamoru Hosoda's films Wolf Children (2012), The Boy and the Beast (2015) and Mirai (2018). He also wrote the music for the Studio Ghibli documentary The Kingdom of Dreams and Madness (2013).

Takagi has lived in Hyogo, Japan since 2013.

Discography
 pia (2001)
 opus pia (2002)
 eating (2002)
 JOURNAL FOR PEOPLE (2002)
 eating 2 (2003)
 rehome (2003)
 sail (2003)
 world is so beautiful (2003)
 COIEDA (2004)
 JOURNAL FOR PEOPLE (2006)
 world is so beautiful (2006)
 AIR'S NOTE (2006)
 BLOOMY GIRLS (2006)
 Private/Public (2007)
 Tai Rei Tei Rio (2009)
 Ymene (2010)
 Niyodo (2011)
 Tama Tama (2011)
 Mikrokozmosz (2012)
 Wolf Children (2012)
 Kagayaki (2014)
 The Boy and the Beast (2015)
 Mirai (2018)
 Marginalia (2018)
 Marginalia II (2019)
 Marginalia III (2021)
 Marginalia IV (2021)
 Okaeri Mone (2021)

References

External links
Official website

1979 births
Anime composers
Japanese electronic musicians
Japanese film score composers
Japanese keyboardists
Japanese male film score composers
Living people
Musicians from Kyoto Prefecture
People from Kyoto